Alburnus neretvae is a species of ray-finned fish in the genus Alburnus. It is endemic to the Neretva River drainage in Croatia and Bosnia and Herzegovina.

References

neretvae
Fish described in 2010